The Jackie Robinson Parkway is a  parkway in the New York City boroughs of Brooklyn and Queens. The western terminus of the parkway is at Jamaica Avenue in the Brooklyn neighborhood of East New York.  It runs through Highland Park, along the north side of Ridgewood Reservoir, and through Forest Park.  The eastern terminus is at the Kew Gardens Interchange in Kew Gardens, Queens, where the Jackie Robinson Parkway meets the Grand Central Parkway and Interstate 678 (I-678, the Van Wyck Expressway). It is designated New York State Route 908B (NY 908B), an unsigned reference route. The parkway was officially named the Interboro Parkway until 1997, when it was renamed for trailblazing Major League Baseball player Jackie Robinson.

Route description
The Jackie Robinson Parkway starts where Jamaica and Pennsylvania Avenues intersect in the Brooklyn neighborhood of East New York. The next four exits are located within the Cemetery Belt on the border of Queens and Brooklyn.

Exit 1, Bushwick Avenue via Highland Boulevard, is a westbound-only exit. The highway enters Queens and passes Mount Judah Cemetery before exit 2 at Vermont Place and Cypress Avenue, which lead to Highland Park and the Hungarian Cemetery. Exit 3, Cypress Hills Street, leads to Cypress Hills Cemetery, where Jackie Robinson is buried. Here the parkway narrows and makes sharp turns. At exit 4, Forest Park Drive, the parkway enters Forest Park. Exit 5 is Myrtle Avenue and Woodhaven Boulevard. At exit 6, Metropolitan Avenue, Union Turnpike straddles the parkway, but there is no access to or from Union Turnpike.

The parkway and Union Turnpike then exit the Forest Park neighborhood, and go under Queens Boulevard (NY 25). Union Turnpike shares a diamond interchange with Queens Boulevard, but there is no access from the parkway. Exit 7, an eastbound-only exit, goes to the Van Wyck Expressway (I-678) northbound (no access southbound). Exit 8 (eastbound only) is the Grand Central Parkway, where the Jackie Robinson Parkway ends.

History

Planning
When built in 1870, Eastern Parkway stretched from Prospect Park to Ralph Avenue in Brooklyn, and was one of two parkways leading from Prospect Park, the other being Ocean Parkway which led to Coney Island. By 1897, Eastern Parkway was being extended further toward Highland Park and planned to enter Queens County at the Ridgewood Reservoir. A further extension of Eastern Parkway was suggested by Brooklyn city officials, running from the Cemetery Belt through Forest Park to Dry Harbor Road and then toward Hoffman Boulevard (now Queens Boulevard). An extension of the Eastern Parkway following a similar route was suggested in 1899 by the Queens County Topographical Bureau, the extension running through Cypress Hills Cemetery and Forest Park to Dry Harbor Road.

Officials proposed an amendment to the Rural Cemetery Act to "provide for the construction of a road" running through the Cemetery Belt. This proposed road was to serve as an extension of Eastern Parkway, running through Cypress Hills Cemetery toward Forest Park where it would connect to an existing road. This bill was introduced in the New York State Legislature in 1901 but failed to pass, as it did every subsequent year it was reintroduced in the legislature. The bill finally was passed in 1908, but no funds were allocated to the project. The parkway project did have the unintended consequence of bringing attention to corruption among the trustees of Cypress Hills Cemetery.

As the presence of motor vehicles were increasing, especially due to the success of Henry Ford's Model T, by July 1923, local civic associations were pressuring the government to build the road. New York City's Board of Estimate proposed to construct the road if local residents financed the construction, to no avail.

In order to exploit a "condition of approval" with the Cypress Hills Cemetery expiring on January 1, 1928, New York City authorities began expediting plans for the parkway in March 1927. The trustees of the cemetery approved the city's acquisition of land for the parkway on the condition that "physical improvement of the road be started" prior to January 1, 1928. The Board of Estimate convened on March 24, 1927 to discuss the cost estimates for the parkway, including land acquisition and grave removal. Several civic associations from Glendale and Ridgewood suggested the cost of parkway construction be split - 45% of the cost would be covered by New York City, 35% would be covered by Brooklyn, 15% by Queens and finally 5% by residents living south of the parkway. This proposal would have exempted Ridgewood and Glendale, neighborhoods north of the parkway, from paying for the parkway construction. The planned parkway would serve as an extension of Eastern Parkway from its terminus in Brooklyn, running through Highland Park toward the Ridgewood Reservoir. From the Ridgewood Reservoir, the parkway would cross Cypress Hills Street into Cypress Hills Cemetery. The parkway would "pass through the cemetery just south of the boundary" with Mount Carmel Cemetery and enter Forest Park, where the New York City Parks Department would construct a "driveway several hundred feet long from the end of the parkway" to connect with an existing road in Forest Park. The estimated costs for this planned parkway was projected at $3.5 million.

Construction
In July 1928, New York City was "granted authority to acquire the land for the roadbed by condemnation" along the eastern section of Highland Park toward Forest Park. However, it was announced on August 1928 that construction commencement on the parkway was delayed "until July or August 1929" due to an issue "routing the road" through the Cypress Hills and Mount Carmel cemeteries while disturbing as few graves as possible. Announced in November 1929, another delay on parkway construction occurred, this time between Cypress Hills Street and Forest Park. The issue surrounding the delay revolved around legal dispute between city authorities and Cypress Hills Cemetery, where New York mayor James J. Walker wanted to "avoid a law suit  over the removal of several hundred bodies" that laid along the path of the projected parkway.

In December 1930, New York State offered to construct the parkway "at their expense" should New York City "agree to acquire a minimum width of 190 feet" for the parkway, rather than the initially planned 150 feet set by the city. The state's offer was ignored due to both its tentative nature and that it would force city officials to reopen "condemnation proceedings" in order to acquire an additional 40 feet of road width along the entire course of the parkway.

On January 2, 1931, city officials announced that the Interboro Parkway would parallel Cypress Avenue to the north, running "along the north side" of the Ridgewood Reservoir to Cypress Hills Street. Cypress Avenue would, as a result, be paved from Cooper Avenue to the Interboro Parkway. Grave exhumation and reburial was required before construction of this section of the highway could begin, and costs were estimated at $675,000.

City officials declared in June 1933 that the Interboro Parkway from Highland Park to Forest Park cost $1.978 million. This cost was split as follows: $959,330 (48%) by New York City, $296,700 (15%) by Brooklyn and Queens each, and $29,670 (1.5%) by the Cypress Hills and Mount Carmel cemeteries.

In the meantime, an extension of the parkway was being constructed from Forest Park toward Metropolitan Avenue and terminating at the Grand Central Parkway, at the present-day Kew Gardens Interchange. The Interboro Parkway was scheduled to open for traffic on November 1, 1934. However, in late December 1933, plans for the parkway were revised; the western terminus of the parkway would be moved to its present-day location at the intersection of Highland Boulevard and Bushwick Avenue. Under this plan, an additional mile of road was to be constructed, requiring the condemnation of 7.5 acres of land from the Cemetery of the Evergreens. This tract of land did not require grave removals as was the case with Cypress Hills and Mount Carmel cemeteries.

Opening
The Interboro Parkway opened to traffic in July 1935. However, it remained unfinished until the completion of the Highland Boulevard-Bushwick Avenue extension in September 1935.  
 
Issues with the parkway designed plagued its usefulness, as declared by the New York City Planning Department in 1941. One issue was the presence of "bad curves" at two sections of the parkway. These curves, as viewed by the department, a "serious hazard" to drivers but rectifying the problem would prove difficult due to the parkway's location through cemeteries. Furthermore, the department criticized a lack of highway connections at the parkway's western terminus in Brooklyn. The department suggested that the proposed Cross Brooklyn Express Highway would connect to the Interboro Parkway, rectifying this problem. However, the proposed Cross Brooklyn Express Highway was never constructed as it was cancelled by New York City mayor John Lindsay in 1969.

Later history
An extension to Jamaica Bay was proposed in 1963. This extension, proposed by Robert Moses, would run 3.4 miles through southern Brooklyn, specifically East New York, New Lots and Starrett City. Pennsylvania Avenue was presumed to serve as a service road for the extended parkway. Construction cost was estimated at $30 million and scheduled for completion in 1976. However, the extension was cancelled in the late 1960s.

On September 12, 1972, Transportation Administrator Constantine Sidamon-Eristoff announced that the New York City Board of Estimate approved a contract for the design of a $1,472,000 project to improve safety on the dangerous -long curved section of the roadway between Cypress Hills Street and Forest Park Drive. Work was expected to begin in summer 1973. The project would realign the roadway where possible to ease S-curves, resurface pavement, install water-filled plastic buffers at accident-prone locations, create spaces along the road for disabled vehicles, and replace 16-inch high barriers in the median of the roadway with three-foot tall concrete barriers. Engineers would also look into the feasibility of widening the roadway, though the retaining walls for cemeteries abutting both sides of the S-curve section posed a challenge to doing so.

The city was also in the process of applying for federal funds for an overall project to modernize the roadway along its entire length, which was expected to cost between $60 million and $75 million. Additional safety hazards on the roadway included many small-radius curves, inadequate median separation barriers, and exits and entrances without acceleration or deceleration lanes. Simon-Eristoff also said that he wanted the roadway to be incorporated into either the federal highway or state arterial systems, which would require state legislation. This legislation was proposed and signed into law by Governor Malcolm Wilson in May 1973.

On November 4, 1974, work began on a reconstruction of a  section of the highway between Cypress Hills Street and Forest Park Drive, where at least ten people were killed and many more were injured in this section over the previous five years. The one-year $1.7 million project would install a reinforced center divider, smooth out asphalt, and bank the S-curves of the roadway. Water-filled plastic containers would be placed at the dangerous westbound exit to Cypress Hills Street to lessen the impact of crashes, and four parking spots would be completed along the roadway with police telephones for stranded drivers. State and city officials estimated it would cost over $70 million to make the entire parkway safe.

Part of the original parkway contract included the construction of a pair of service stations just west of exit 6 (Metropolitan Avenue) in Forest Park. The stone-faced gas stations, which were located along the eastbound and westbound lanes of the parkway, were torn down in the late 1970s.

The New York State Department of Transportation began reconstructing parts of the parkway in 1987. Ramps along the parkway were rebuilt, converting the junction with Metropolitan Avenue at Exit 6 from a "tight cloverleaf interchange" to a four-ramp diamond interchange. The road was rebuilt as well, installing a concrete median and new lighting along the route. Speed limits were decreased at the swerving curve at the Cypress Hills Cemetery and at the curve beneath the Queens Boulevard underpass, problem spots noted earlier in the 1941 report by the New York City Planning Department. Reconstruction finished in 1992.

The parkway's name was changed to honor Jackie Robinson in May 1997, as part of 50th anniversary activities marking his breaking of the baseball color line. In addition to playing for the Brooklyn Dodgers, Robinson was known to live and own property in the area along the parkway, and his gravesite is located in Cypress Hills Cemetery, located adjacent to exit 3.

A juncture at the eastern end of the parkway was placed on the list of New York State's most dangerous roads in 2007, based on accident data from 2004–2006.

Exit list

See also

 Transportation in New York City

References

External links

 Jackie Robinson Parkway at NYCRoads

Parkways in New York City
Parkway
Transportation in Queens, New York
Transportation in Brooklyn